Barcelona Enginyers Rugby is a Spanish rugby team based in Barcelona.

History
The club was founded in 1989.

External links
Barcelona Enginyers Rugby

Sports clubs in Barcelona
Rugby union teams in Catalonia
Rugby clubs established in 1989
1989 establishments in Catalonia